Orozimbo Fuenzalida y Fuenzalida (May 22, 1925 – March 27, 2013) was the Catholic bishop of the Diocese of San Bernardo, Chile.

Ordained to the priesthood in 1951, Fuenzalida y Fuenzalida was named bishop in 1968 and retired in 2003.

He was Prelate of Calama and Titular Bishop of Burca from 1968 until 1970, Bishop of Santa María de Los Ángeles from 1970 until 1987, and Bishop of San Bernardo from 1987 until 2003.

Notes

1925 births
2013 deaths
20th-century Roman Catholic bishops in Chile
21st-century Roman Catholic bishops in Chile
Roman Catholic bishops of San Juan de Calama
Roman Catholic bishops of Santa María de Los Ángeles
Roman Catholic bishops of San Bernardo